Bogoslovija is a Serbian-Croatian word for a seminary. In particular it is often used for secondary schools educating future Orthodox priests.

Serbian Orthodox Seminaries 

 , Belgrade, Serbia
 Serbian Orthodox Seminary of St. Arsenije, Sremski Karlovci, Serbia
 Serbian Orthodox Seminary of Sts. Cyril and Methodius, Prizren
 Serbian Orthodox Seminary of St. Peter of Cetinje, Cetinje
 , Krka Monastery
 , Kragujevac, Serbia
 , Foča
 Serbian Orthodox Seminary of St. Sava, Libertyville, Illinois

Localities 

 Bogoslovija, a neighbourhood of Belgrade, Serbia